The 7mm Shooting Times Westerner, sometimes referred to as the 7mm STW began as a wildcat rifle cartridge developed by Layne Simpson in 1979. It is an 8mm Remington Magnum case that has been "necked down" (narrowing the case opening) by 1 mm to accept 7 mm (.284 in) bullets. This cartridge is named after the magazine Shooting Times where Layne Simpson is a regular contributor.

Background
The 7mm STW graduated to commercial status when it was officially recognized by SAAMI in 1996. 
Remington Arms Company was one of the first large ammunition companies to produce this cartridge in 1997, with others like Federal Cartridge Company, A-Square, and Speer also carrying it. Many US riflemakers now offer a selection of production models chambered for the 7mm STW, which has established a reputation as a fine long-range elk and large game rifle.
Layne Simpson may have popularized the cartridge when he named it the 7mm STW, but he is not the first to make or use such a cartridge. Jon Herold, a gunsmith from Waynesboro PA, used it in 1000 yd matches at Williamsport, PA at least 10 years before.

See also
7mm caliber for other cartridges of this caliber.
Table of handgun and rifle cartridges

References
Rifle Shooter Magazine article on 7mm cartridges

7mm STW
Magnum rifle cartridges
Wildcat cartridges